This article summarizes the events, album releases, and album release dates in hip hop music for the year 2008.

Events

January
The Game states that after his third album, L.A.X., he will retire.
Freekey Zeekey states that all is well with Dipset, and they are working on new projects.
Rick Ross says that Trilla will be one of the best albums of 2008, and that he and Birdman are recording an album together, as well as making a movie together.
50 Cent, Timbaland, Mary J. Blige, and Wyclef Jean are listed in the Albany, New York Times Union list of steroid trafficking.
Eminem was rushed to the hospital due to complications of pneumonia, and reports said his weight had exceeded 200 pounds.
Twista launches a new label called the Get Money Gang.
Flo Rida breaks a digital sales record, by selling over 470,000 digital units in one week.
Nate Dogg suffers a stroke.
L.A. Reid is named Def Jam President, after Jay-Z stepped down to pursue other options.
Joell Ortiz leaves Aftermath Entertainment after not being able to produce music at the rate he wanted to.

February
Devin the Dude leaves Rap-a-Lot Records.
A tabloid is circulated, that says Benzino was with Fat Joe's wife in the past, but the magazine was later found out to be fake.
MTV president Christina Norman leaves her position.
The Game was given 2 months in jail because of his several incidents of violence.
DJ Khaled initializes a label under Def Jam, called We The Best Music. He signs his first artist, Ace Hood.
Ruthless Records returns, with help from Sony. Eazy-E's wife Tomica Woods-Wright is the CEO of the re-formed company.
Nas says his album, Nigger, will be released in April.
TVT Records (home of Lil Jon, Ying Yang Twins, and Pitbull) closes down after 22 years in the business.
Lil Wayne says his album, Tha Carter III, will be released in April.
Producer and songwriter Static Major dies.
KRS-One and DJ Revolution sign to Duck Down Records.
Fat Joe and 50 Cent's feud continues, with Fat Joe saying that in a fair fight, 50 would probably beat him, but he would love to send him to the dentist.

March
Disturbing tha Peace signs with Def Jam.
Fat Joe and 50 Cent continue to beef, especially through the internet and through videos. G-Unit releases a mixtape called "The Elephant In The Sand".
G Unit's DJ, Whoo Kid, says he is going to retire.
Eminem and Royce Da 5'9" cease the beef.
Chuck Philips of the Los Angeles Times says that Diddy and  Jimmy Rosemond were in on the assault of Tupac Shakur, but Diddy denies the rumor.
Jadakiss speaks on his highly anticipated debut album with Def Jam.
Tha Carter III is set to be released on May 13, while L.A.X. is set to be released on June 24.
Los Angeles Times reports that said Diddy knew about the Tupac Shakur shooting before it happened were based on fraudulent documents, but the Los Angeles Times later apologized for the rumors.
T.I. is found guilty for gun charges.
Nate Dogg pleads guilty on a domestic violence charge.
Remy Ma was found guilty of charges that were put against her last year, and could face up to 25 years in prison.
Former Dipset member Max B is shot, and is said to be in critical condition.
Nelly says that his first album in four years, Brass Knuckles, is set to be released later in 2008.
50 Cent talks about the fake Benzino/Fat Joe Hip Hop Weekly album cover(he says he did not create it), and fires "warning shots" at Rick Ross.

April
KL of Screwball dies of a heart attack.
Jay-Z signs a $150,000,000 deal with Live Nation.
Despite the big signs Diddy made to get Notorious B.I.G., Mase, and Mary J. Blige, Diddy says that his biggest sign is Janelle Monáe.
Trina's album, Still da Baddest, is the number 1 on the Rap albums on Billboard.
New Orleans rapper VL Mike is murdered on April 20 at age 32.
Tha Carter III is pushed back again, to June.
Jermaine Dupri and TAG Body Spray launch a hip hop record label.
DJ Whoo Kid says he doesn't want to retire, but he's not going to stick around until he's 40.
The Trackmasters return.
Ja Rule says that soon he will release his new album, The Mirror.
Bobby Valentino leaves Disturbing Tha Peace.
The UK ban of Snoop Dogg is lifted.
The Game moves the release date on L.A.X. from June 24 to July 8.

May
DMX is arrested in Arizona because of drug and animal cruelty charges.
MTV gets hip-hop hate because of the mediocre rappers that were on the list of the best.
Suge Knight is assaulted and hospitalized.
Remy Ma's case gets re-evaluated, and only has to serve 8 years in prison.
Mass Appeal Magazine calls it quits after 12 years running.
 Rick Ross's Trilla becomes the first hip hop album to be certified gold in 2008, due to the heavy airplay of his second single, "The Boss".
Dunk Ryders sign to Cash Money Records.
A G-Unit representative denies the reports of the $300,000,000 deal.
Nas co-signs Jay Electronica.
Nas changes the name of his formerly titled Nigger album to Nas.
Polow da Don is named the Songwriter of the Year by BMI.
Saigon is released from Atlantic Records.
New York governor David Paterson pardons Slick Rick, ending his immigration woes.
A judge orders Suge Knight to sell Death Row Records.
Yung Joc starts his own label under Jive Records called Swagg Team Entertainment, signing Chicago rap trio Hotstylz as its first act.

June
Trick Daddy leaves Slip-N-Slide Records, and has talks with Def Jam.
Shakir Stewart gets promoted to Executive VP of Def Jam.
Charli Baltimore re-signs with Murder Inc Records
Nas's album name changes again, to Untitled.
The Game changes his release date of the album L.A.X. again, to July 22, and also says that he has made the decision to not make LAX his last album.
 Lil Wayne's album, Tha Carter III, sells over a million copies for its first week. This feat was last done by 50 Cent's The Massacre. His debut single from the album, "Lollipop" was #1 on Billboard 100 for 5 non-consecutive weeks.
T.I. signs 8Ball & MJG, while he continues to have beef with Shawty Lo and 50 Cent.
The Orchard wins the bid for TVT Records to buy out the bankrupt label.
Nate Dogg is arrested for terrorist threats to his girlfriend.
DMX is arrested for not having a valid driver's license.
The Game's album, L.A.X., is once again pushed back, this time to August 26.
2 Pistols falls after one punch at a BET Awards pre-party from Dolla after back-and-forth disses.
D-Block is set to release a new album; their first group album since 2000.
Death Row is sold in an auction after Suge Knight was ordered to sell the label; it was sold for 24 million dollars to Susan Berg.
DJ Khaled is set to release the album, We Global, later in 2008.
BET loses the sponsorship over violence, profanity, and obscenity in hip-hop videos. (Industry Ears and CNN, Procter & Gamble, Pepsi and General Motors pulled their ads from Rap City and 106 & Park.)
The Clipse will release their album, Clipse Presents: Re-Up Gang, later in 2008 on Koch Records.
Snoop Dogg states that he is impressed by Detox, Dr. Dre's new album. He also says that Dre will produce his new album.
Kanye West was reportedly booed at 2008's Bonnaroo festival. A couple of days later, he responded with an all-caps rant post on his blog, KanyeUniverseCity.

July
50 Cent sues Taco Bell for $4 million because the food chain had used his name without permission.
Gucci Mane is arrested on gun and drug charges.
Nas teams up with MoveOn.org and Color of Change to obtain signatures to end the accusations of Barack Obama.
Lil Wayne's album, Tha Carter III, is certified double platinum.
Bone Thugs-n-Harmony reunite after many years with the release of Flesh-n-Bone from jail and the return of turmoiled group member Bizzy Bone. They are recording a reunion album.
LL Cool J denies signing with G-Unit Records.
It has been found out that popular Miami rapper Rick Ross used to be a correctional officer before becoming a rapper.
Veteran New Orleans rapper, Sporty T murdered inside of a trailer.
Baltimore DJ, K-Swift, dies in a swimming pool.
The mayor of Houston proclaimed July 22, "Trae Day", for Trae's help in the community and city.
 Upcoming Rapper Kid Cudi Drops Mixtape  A Kid Named Cudi Spawning Two Singles Day 'n' Nite And T.G.I.F..

August
Master P gets the key to the city of Memphis for the "Let The Kids Grow Day" project he organized.
Dr. Dre's daughter releases a controversial documentary called Daddy's Shadow talking about her dad not supporting her dreams of rapping.
Big Boi and Killer Mike end their 3-year feud.
Yung Berg is arrested for possession of a pistol and marijuana.
Trae and Mike Jones get into an altercation at the 2008 Ozone Awards.
Ice Cube's new album, Raw Footage, is leaked onto the internet.
Cam'ron sold Juelz Santana's contract to Def Jam for $2 million, hence removing Santana from the Diplomats roster.
DJ Vlad sues Rick Ross for assaulting him.
50 Cent is #1 on Forbes''' 2008 Hip-Hop Cash Kings, making $150 million last year for his Vitamin Water deal, his sales of Curtis, and his G-Unit clothing, and his record label.  Following behind is Jay-Z at #2, Diddy at #3, and Kanye West at #4. Common, Akon, & Lil Wayne made first time showings on the list.
Da Brat is sentenced to three years in prison for striking a woman with a rum bottle at an Atlanta nightclub in 2007.
The Game's new album, L.A.X., is leaked onto the Internet earlier than expected.
Dr. Dre's son, Andre Young, Jr., aged 20, was found dead on August 23, 2008.
Young Jeezy's new album, The Recession, is leaked onto the Internet.
LL Cool J's new album, Exit 13, is leaked onto the Internet a day before its release.

September
Yung Berg was hospitalized after being beaten up and robbed for his Transformers necklace in Detroit at Trick Trick's club, Plan B.
Kanye West was arrested for damaging two of the paparazzi's cameras.  He posted bail for $20,000.
Nelly's new album, Brass Knuckles, is leaked onto the Internet four days before its release.
50 Cent stated that his album Before I Self Destruct will be released on December 9, 2008, a week before Kanye's album will be released.
Nate Dogg suffers his second stroke in less than a year. He is reported in critical condition.
T.I.'s new album, Paper Trail, is released on September 30, 2008. It achieved gold status in its first week and debuted at number one on the Billboard 200. The album sold 568,000 copies and became T.I.'s biggest debut to date.  His album yielded two #1 hit singles ("Whatever You Like" & "Live Your Life").
Ludacris's pool house gets set on fire.
Kanye West has pushed his album 808s and Heartbreak to November.

October
Maino allegedly smacked Yung Berg in the face.
C-Murder supposed to appear in court on October 14, for his murder trial.
Johnny J, a Hip-Hop producer known for producing many of Tupac Shakur's songs, dies after allegedly committing suicide by jumping of a tier of a county jail.
50 Cent releases first single "Get Up" off new album Before I Self Destruct due December 9.
Eminem tells Shade 45 that his new album will be called Relapse.
Kanye West new album 808s and Heartbreak to be released November 25.
Lil Jon signs to Universal Republic Records and plans to release next album sometime in 2009.
Lil Wayne stated that he will release the reissue of Tha Carter III, naming it Tha Carter III: The Rebirth.  He now has another boy named Dwayne Carter III.  He also won 9 BET Hip-Hop Awards the same day.
Lil Boosie has been arrested for marijuana and weapons possession in Baton Rouge, Louisiana.

November
 Shakir Steward, president of Def Jam Records, died of a self-inflicted gun wound.
 Lupe Fiasco stated that Lupe E.N.D. will be his final album, but it will be a triple CD set.
 Chamillionaire releases his first single from his third studio album, Venom, called Creepin' (Solo) featuring Ludacris.
 MC Breed passes away at the age of 36.
 8 Mile actor, De'Angelo Wilson dies of suicide by hanging.

December
 Another arrest warrant is issued to DMX.
 Lil Wayne has the most Grammy nominations for the Grammy Awards 2009 of eight nods.  Jay-Z & Kanye West both received 6 nominations each, while T.I. & Lupe Fiasco both received 4 nominations each.
 Chingy has been dropped from DTP/Def Jam Records due to lackluster sales on his fourth album, Hate It Or Love It.
 Plies releases his 3rd studio album in less than 17 months titled, Da Realist''.
 Jim Jones was arrested for allegedly beating up a friend of the R&B singer Ne-Yo outside the Louis Vuitton store in New York City in December 2008; he has pleaded not guilty.

Albums

Highest-charting singles

Highest first week sales
As of December 31, 2008.

Highest critically reviewed albums (Metacritic)

See also
Previous article: 2007 in hip hop music
Next article: 2009 in hip hop music

References

2000s in hip hop music
Hip hop
Hip hop music by year